Team 3C Casalinghi Jet Androni Giocattoli was a professional continental cycling team based in Italy that participates in UCI Continental Circuits races and when selected as a wildcard to UCI ProTour events. The team is managed by Mario Manzoni with Massimo Rabbaglio assisting as a directeur sportif. For the 2007 season, the team merged into the Team L.P.R. structure.

2006 squad

References
2005 team
2006 team

Cycling teams based in Italy
Defunct cycling teams based in Italy
Cycling teams disestablished in 2006
Cycling teams established in 2005